The Ultimate Yes: 35th Anniversary Collection is a compilation album by the English progressive rock band Yes. It was originally released on 2 CDs on 28 July 2003 by Warner Music in the United Kingdom. A 3 CD edition with additional material, including new recordings from October 2003, was released in the US on 27 January 2004 by Rhino Records.

The album was a commercial success in the UK, reaching No. 10 on the UK Albums Chart to become their highest performance on the chart since Union in 1991. It is certified gold by the British Phonographic Industry for selling 100,000 copies. In the US, it peaked at No. 131 on the Billboard 200. The Ultimate Yes was supported with a one-off acoustic performance recorded on Yes Acoustic: Guaranteed No Hiss (2004) and their 35th Anniversary Tour, covering Europe and North America through 2004.

U.S. track listing

Disc one

"Time and a Word" (Jon Anderson/David Foster) – 4:33
"Starship Trooper" – 9:29
a. "Life Seeker" (Anderson)
b. "Disillusion" (Chris Squire)
c. "Würm" (Steve Howe)
"Yours Is No Disgrace" (Anderson/Squire/Howe/Tony Kaye/Bill Bruford) – 9:41
"I've Seen All Good People" – 6:56
a. "Your Move" (Anderson)
b. "All Good People" (Squire)
"Roundabout" (Anderson/Howe) – 8:32
"Long Distance Runaround" (Anderson) – 3:31
"Heart of the Sunrise" (Anderson/Squire/Bruford) – 10:37
"South Side of the Sky" (Anderson/Squire) – 7:56
"And You and I" (Anderson; Themes by Bruford/Howe/Squire) – 10:09
I. "Cord of Life"
II. "Eclipse" (Anderson/Bruford/Howe)
III. "The Preacher the Teacher"
IV. "Apocalypse"
"America" (Single edit) (Paul Simon) – 4:10
"Wonderous Stories" (Anderson) – 3:49

Disc two
"Siberian Khatru" (Anderson; Themes by Anderson/Howe/Rick Wakeman) – 8:56
"Soon" (New edit) (Anderson/Squire/Howe/Alan White/Patrick Moraz) – 5:44
"Going for the One" (Anderson) – 5:32
"Don't Kill the Whale" (Anderson/Squire) – 3:57
"Tempus Fugit" (Geoff Downes/Trevor Horn/Howe/Squire/White) – 5:16
"Owner of a Lonely Heart" (Trevor Rabin/Anderson/Squire/Horn) – 4:28
"Leave It" (Squire/Rabin/Horn) – 4:19
"It Can Happen (Single edit)" (Squire/Anderson/Rabin) – 4:18
"Rhythm of Love" (Anderson/Kaye/Rabin/Squire) – 4:52
"Big Generator" (Remix) (Anderson/Kaye/Rabin/Squire/White) – 3:39
"Lift Me Up" (Rabin/Squire) – 6:31
"The Calling" (Single edit) (Anderson/Rabin/Squire) – 4:39
"Open Your Eyes" (Anderson/Squire/Howe/White/Billy Sherwood) – 5:15
"Homeworld (The Ladder)" (Radio edit) (Anderson/Squire/Howe/White/Sherwood/Igor Khoroshev) – 4:39
"Magnification" (Anderson/Squire/Howe/White) – 7:19

Disc three
"Roundabout (Acoustic)" (Anderson/Howe) – 4:18
"Show Me" (Anderson) – 3:37
"South Side of the Sky (Acoustic)" – 4:28
I. "South Side of the Sky" (Anderson/Squire)
II. "South Side Variations" (Wakeman)
"Australia (Solo Acoustic)" (Howe) – 4:12
"New World Symphony" (Squire, based on Antonin Dvořák's Symphony No. 9 in E minor) – 3:33

UK track listing

Disc one
"Yours Is No Disgrace" (Anderson/Squire/Howe/Kaye/Bruford) – 9:42
"Survival" (Anderson) – 6:20
"Roundabout" (Anderson/Howe) – 8:32
"Then" (Anderson) – 5:47
"I've Seen All Good People" – 6:55
a. "Your Move" (Anderson)
b. "All Good People" (Squire)
"Heart of the Sunrise" (Anderson/Squire/Bruford) – 10:36
"Starship Trooper" – 9:29
a. "Life Seeker" (Anderson)
b. "Disillusion" (Squire)
c. "Würm" (Howe)
"Ritual (Nous Sommes du Soleil)" (Anderson/Howe/Squire/Wakeman/White) – 21:32

Disc two
"Siberian Khatru" (Anderson; Themes by Anderson/Howe/Wakeman) – 8:56
"Long Distance Runaround" (Anderson) – 3:31
"Wonderous Stories" (Anderson) – 3:49
"And You and I" (Alternate version) (Anderson; Themes by Bruford/Howe/Squire) – 10:15
I. "Cord of Life"
II. "Eclipse" (Anderson/Bruford/Howe)
III. "The Preacher the Teacher"
IV. "Apocalypse"
"Soon" (Single edit) (Anderson) – 4:08
"Going for the One" (Anderson) – 5:32
"Don't Kill the Whale" (Anderson/Squire) – 3:57
"Owner of a Lonely Heart" (Rabin/Anderson/Squire/Horn) – 4:28
"Leave It" (Squire/Rabin/Horn) – 4:19
"Big Generator" (Remix) (Anderson/Kaye/Rabin/Squire/White) – 3:39
"The Calling" (Single edit) (Anderson/Rabin/Squire) – 4:39
"Homeworld (The Ladder)" (Radio edit) (Anderson/Squire/Howe/White/Sherwood/Khoroshev) – 4:39
"Awaken"  (Anderson/Howe) – 15:31

Song origins

US release
 Track 1 of Disc 1 from Time and a Word
 Tracks 2–4 of Disc 1 from The Yes Album
 Tracks 5–8 of Disc 1 from Fragile
 Track 9 of Disc 1 and track 1 of Disc 2 from Close to the Edge
 Track 10 of Disc 1 released as a non-album single
 Track 2 of Disc 2 from Relayer, later released as a single, new edit previously unissued
 Track 11 of Disc 1 and track 3 of Disc 2 from Going for the One
 Track 4 of Disc 2 from Tormato
 Track 5 of Disc 2 from Drama
 Tracks 6–8 of Disc 2 from 90125
 Tracks 9 & 10 of Disc 2 from Big Generator (the latter is a remix previously unissued)
 Track 11 of Disc 2 from Union
 Track 12 of Disc 2 from Talk
 Track 13 of Disc 2 from Open Your Eyes
 Track 14 of Disc 2 from The Ladder
 Track 15 of Disc 2 from Magnification
 Tracks 1–5 of Disc 3 previously unissued

UK release
 Track 2 of Disc 1 from Yes
 Track 4 of Disc 1 from Time and a Word
 Tracks 1, 5, and 7 of Disc 1 from The Yes Album
 Tracks 3 & 6 of Disc 1 and track 2 of Disc 2 from Fragile
 Tracks 1 & 4 of Disc 2 from Close to the Edge
 Track 8 of Disc 1 from Tales from Topographic Oceans
 Track 5 of Disc 2 from Relayer
 Tracks 3, 6, & 13 of Disc 2 from Going for the One
 Track 7 of Disc 2 from Tormato
 Tracks 8 & 9 of Disc 2 from 90125
 Track 10 of Disc 2 from Big Generator (Original Version of the song appears on Big Generator)
 Track 11 of Disc 2 from Talk
 Track 12 of Disc 2 from The Ladder

Personnel
This list is in chronological order by who first joined the band (or when they joined the band for the first time).

 Jon Anderson – Lead vocals (1969–1980, 1983–2004)
 Chris Squire – Bass guitar, Backing vocals (1969–1981, 1983–2004)
 Peter Banks – Lead guitars (1969–1970)
 Bill Bruford – Drums, Percussion (1969–1972, 1990–1992)
 Tony Kaye – Keyboards (1969–1971, 1983–1994)
 Steve Howe  – Lead guitars, Backing vocals (1971–1981, 1990–1992, 1995–2004)
 Rick Wakeman – Keyboards (1971–1974, 1977–1980, 1990–1992, 1995–1996, 2002–2004)
 Alan White – Drums, Percussion (1973–1981, 1983–2004)
 Patrick Moraz – Keyboards (1974–1976)
 Trevor Horn – Lead vocals (1980–1981)
 Geoff Downes – Keyboards (1980–1981)
 Trevor Rabin – Lead guitars, Backing/Lead vocals, Keyboards (1983–1994)
 Billy Sherwood – Rhythm guitars, Keyboards, Backing vocals (1997–2000)
 Igor Khoroshev – Keyboards (1997–2001) (except on track 13 of Disc 2, U.S. Release)

Additional personnel
 Steve Porcaro – keyboards on track 13 of Disc 2, U.S. Release

Personnel on Disc 3, U.S. Release
 Jon Anderson – lead vocals, acoustic rhythm guitar (tracks 1–3)
 Chris Squire – acoustic bass guitar (tracks 1–4), electric bass (track 5), backing vocals (tracks 1–3)
 Steve Howe – lead acoustic guitar, backing vocals (tracks 1–3)
 Rick Wakeman – piano (tracks 1–3)
 Alan White – drums, percussion (tracks 1–3)

New recordings
The later US release included a third disc of new recordings. These included three semi-acoustic band recordings, similar to what the band had been playing live: two versions of old Yes songs ("Roundabout" and "South Side of the Sky") and one new song by Anderson ("Show Me"). Also included was a Howe solo recording, a new version of his solo piece from the 1970s, "Australia", recorded with the help of Oliver Wakeman, Rick's son, who would later join Yes. Finally, "New World Symphony" was a solo recording by Squire, an adaptation of Dvorak's Symphony No. 9 in E min.

The lyrics to "Show Me" are about the Gulf War.

Charts

Certifications

References

2003 greatest hits albums
2004 greatest hits albums
Albums produced by Eddy Offord
Albums produced by Trevor Horn
Albums produced by Bruce Fairbairn
Albums produced by Jonathan Elias
Albums produced by Trevor Rabin
Albums with cover art by Roger Dean (artist)
Yes (band) compilation albums
Rhino Records compilation albums